INS Udaygiri is the Indian Navy's third ship of the stealth-guided missile frigates.

Naming
Named after a mountain range in the Indian state of Andhra Pradesh, the ship has been christened after the INS Udaygiri, a Leander-class frigate which was in service with the Indian Navy between 1976 and 2007.

Construction and career 
The ship was laid down on 28 December 2017 and was launched on 17 May 2022. The ship is expected to be commissioned by the end of 2024.

This ship is part of the Project-17 Alpha frigates (P-17A), a class of guided-missile frigates currently being constructed for the Navy by Mazagon Dock Shipbuilders (MDL) and Garden Reach Shipbuilders & Engineers (GRSE).

References

See also
 Future of the Indian Navy

Frigates of the Indian Navy
2022 ships
Udaygiri (2022)
Ships built in India